Robert Stuart Carr was the Democratic President of the West Virginia Senate from Kanawha County and served from 1889 to 1891.

References

Democratic Party West Virginia state senators
Presidents of the West Virginia State Senate
1845 births
1925 deaths